Zohan (also Romanized as Zohān and Zahān) is a village in Barzanun Rural District, Sarvelayat District, Nishapur County, Razavi Khorasan Province, Iran. At the 2006 census, its population was 966, in 225 families.

References 

Populated places in Nishapur County